This is a list of the National Register of Historic Places listings in Kinney County, Texas.

This is intended to be a complete list of properties and districts listed on the National Register of Historic Places in Kinney County, Texas. There are one district and one individual property listed on the National Register in the county. The individual property is both a State Antiquities Landmark and a Recorded Texas Historic Landmark while the district contains multiple Recorded Texas Historic Landmarks.

Current listings

The locations of National Register properties and districts may be seen in a mapping service provided.

|}

See also

National Register of Historic Places listings in Texas
Recorded Texas Historic Landmarks in Kinney County

References

External links

Kinney County, Texas
Kinney County
Buildings and structures in Kinney County, Texas